The Lex Diamond Story is the third studio album by American hip hop recording artist and Wu-Tang Clan-member Raekwon, released December 16, 2003, on his Ice H2O label through Universal Records. The album features contributions from Wu-Tang members Ghostface Killah, Method Man, Masta Killa, Inspectah Deck, and Cappadonna, with production by several hip hop producers, including Emile and DJ Khalil.

Track listing

Charts

References

Notes

External links 
 The Lex Diamond Story at Discogs
 Album Review at Washington City Paper

Raekwon albums
2003 albums
Universal Records albums
Albums produced by DJ Khalil
Albums produced by Emile Haynie